Lamarre is a French Canadian family name derived from the residents of La Mare, and may refer to:

Ryan LaMarre, American professional baseball player
Daniel Lamarre, president and COO of Cirque du Soleil
Jacques Lamarre, former CEO of SNC-Lavalin
Lucie Lamarre, judge currently serving on the Tax Court of Canada
Whynter Lamarre, former Canadian water polo goaltender 
Yvon Lamarre, former Canadian politician and a City Councillor in Montreal, Quebec